Pasadena City College (PCC) is a public community college in Pasadena, California.

History 

Pasadena City College was founded in 1924 as Pasadena Junior College. From 1928 to 1953, it operated as a four-year junior college, combining the last two years of high school with the first two years of college.

In 1954, Pasadena Junior College merged with another junior college, John Muir College, to become Pasadena City College. In 1966, voters approved the creation of the Pasadena Area Junior College District. The name was subsequently changed to the Pasadena Area Community College District. Pasadena City College is accredited by the Accrediting Commission for Community and Junior Colleges of the Western Association of Schools and Colleges, an institutional accrediting body recognized by the Commission on Recognition of Postsecondary Accreditation and the U.S. Department of Education.

The Shatford Library is a direct descendant of the original Pasadena High School library that originally occupied the campus. The $16.5-million Shatford Library opened September 7, 1993, and holds 133,024 volumes in the general book collection, over 300 periodical subscriptions (plus over 2,000 titles in electronic databases) 7,338 audio cassettes, 1,019 paperbacks, 661 CDs and software, 404 volumes in the Special Services collection, and 1,186 videocassettes. Walter T. Shatford II, is the attorney for whom the library was named in recognition of his four decades of service on the school's board and his donations. He was also active in the Civil Rights Movement.

In 2003, voters approved a bond measure for about $150 million that improved campus facilities. A significant portion of these funds were earmarked for the construction of a new building to house the college's art and music departments. The Alumni Commons, the Aquatic Center, the Boone Sculpture Garden, and the Galloway Plaza have all replaced what were once campus parking lots. A new fourth floor parking structure (Lot 5) and a new bus parking area were completed in 2005.

In 2007, many services at the school had to relocate pending demolition of their previous facilities. These included the college bookstore, Student Affairs, Associated Students, the student business services, the campus police and the offices of the school newspaper The Courier. A groundbreaking ceremony for the construction of the new Industrial and Technology building, Campus Center and Bookstore took place in October 2007. The Campus Center and Bookstore opened in August 2009. The school is one of the few community colleges with its own observatory, planetarium, and seismograph.

Administration and governance

The college is governed by a nine-member board of trustees. Seven members are elected (each of whom represents a geographical section of the Pasadena Area Community College District, which includes Pasadena, Altadena, La Caňada Flintridge, Sierra Madre, South Pasadena, San Marino, Arcadia, Temple City, the western portion of El Monte, the northern portion of Rosemead and the East Pasadena/East San Gabriel unincorporated area); one is a student trustee who is elected by the student body; and one is the sitting college president, who is also the district superintendent. Mark W. Rocha, former West Los Angeles College president, assumed the role of president/superintendent on July 1, 2010, when he was chosen to replace Lisa Sugimoto.  His presidency was controversial with some constituents, including the faculty who twice voted "no confidence" in him, and he resigned in the summer of 2014.

Previous presidents/superintendents include Jack Scott (1987–1995), who served as California State Assemblymember from 1996 to 2000 and California State Senator from 2000 to 2008. , Scott is Chancellor of the California Community College system; James Kossler, 1995–2007; Paulette Perfumo, who held the position from August 2007 until her abrupt resignation in 2009; and Lisa Sugimoto, who served as acting president through the end of the 2009–2010 academic year.

Demographics 

The school attracts students from throughout Southern California, enrolling a large percentage of student from outside the bounds of the Pasadena Area Community College District, which was established in 1966. The district includes the cities of Pasadena, South Pasadena, Altadena, San Marino, Temple City, La Cañada Flintridge, Arcadia, Sierra Madre, and portions of Rosemead and El Monte.

, there are approximately 27,324 students enrolled in the school. Full-time enrollment 10,422 and part-time 16,902 students. The student-faculty ratio is 26-to-1. The demographics of the students in 2012: 43.2 percent Hispanic, 26.8 percent Asian or Pacific Islander, 9 percent Caucasian, 3.9 percent African American, and 0.1 percent American Indian. 51.2 percent of the students are female, while 48.3 percent are male.

The in-state tuition and fees for 2017-2018 were $1,348, and out-of-state tuition and fees were $7,004. There is no application fee.

The staff members of the International Student Office assist international students in the application process and support their transition during their time at the school. Before registration, international students are required to pass the English as a Second Language (ESL) and Math placement examinations before being accepted into the school. They are also required to attend counseling to plan for classes. Assistance is available to become familiar with campus resources, i.e., Counseling Office, Library, Learning Assistance Center (LAC), the ESL Center, and Computing Services. It is recommended that all students meet with a counselor to develop a Student Educational Plan (SEP) (L104).

In 2015, there were 425 full-time professors and 1,119 part-time professors. They are represented by the Academic Senate and the Faculty Association. There were 322 classified staff. There were a total of 77 administrators (managers, directors, supervisors, deans, vice-president and president), represented by the Management Association.

Academic programs

Graphic Communications Technology 
Originally the printing program, this program has provided training in commercial printing, including lithography and screen printing, since the 1940s.

Mathematics 
The math department has won the AMATYC community college mathematics competition numerous times. PCC is also one of the only colleges which is invited to participate in the William Lowell Putnam Mathematical Competition.

Ethnic studies 
Pasadena City College has a long history of teaching Ethnic studies at the community college level. These include courses in Asian American studies, Chicano studies, African American studies, and American Indian studies.

Languages 
Pasadena City College offers courses in the following languages: American Sign Language (ASL), Arabic (Standard), Armenian (Western), Chinese (Mandarin), French, German, Italian, Japanese, Latin, Portuguese (Brazilian), Russian,  Spanish and English as a Second Language (ESL).

Music 
The music department provides the Pasadena City College Herald Trumpets and the honor band for the Rose Parade. It is also the host of the annual Bandfest, held annually at year's end by the Pasadena Tournament of Roses in the Robinson Stadium. At one time, its applied music staff included John Dearman of the L.A. Guitar Quartet.

Health care 
Pasadena City College offers a course for anesthetic technicians. In partnership with Kaiser Permanente, the school's anesthesia technician program is recognized by the American Society of Anesthesia Technologists and Technicians.

Pasadena City College was the first community college in Southern California to offer an approved program for speech-language pathology assistants.

Product Design
The Product Design Department emphasizes on function, environmental and social concerns, and the art form. Students learn about digital product design with programs such as AutoCAD and SolidWorks. The department has a fabrication laboratory, called the FabLab, which students can use to 3D print and laser cut projects, free of charge.

Visual Arts
The Visual Arts Division has a celebrated annual artist-in-residence program, a sculpture garden, an active gallery program featuring professional artists, and a high transfer rate to specialized art and design schools, including the nearby Art Center College of Design.

Television and Radio 
The Television and Radio Department offers courses in television and radio. There are certificate programs in TV production, TV operations, TV post-production, radio production, broadcast journalism and others. PCC graduates often transfer to four-year schools such as USC, UCLA and CSUN, while others have gone on to obtain employment at NBC, Fox, Paramount, TVG and KPCC.

Students may participate in the student-run radio station "Lancer Radio". PCC owns and leases the FCC license to broadcast on station KPCC 89.3 FM. KPCC is a member station of National Public Radio, managed and operated by Southern California Public Radio from their facility on Raymond Avenue in Pasadena. Although the station was started in the mid-1950s with equipment from the former KWKW-FM radio station for the purpose of training students in radio broadcasting, the college currently has no other direct connection to the management or operation of KPCC. Student involvement is limited to a contractual agreement to accept 12 student interns per year.

Publishing 
The Courier is the official student award-winning newspaper of Pasadena City College. It has been honored with a General Excellence Award by the Journalism Association of Community Colleges. The students were also honored for their work on the campus newspaper.

Athletics 
Athletic programs available at Pasadena City College include basketball, cross country, swimming, tennis, track and field, volleyball, baseball, softball, football, and soccer. The sports teams are known as the Lancers, and the school colors are cardinal red and gold. The school's baseball team uses the Jackie Robinson Field, located near the Rose Bowl, for practices and home games.

Robinson Stadium is named for Jackie and Mack Robinson, both of whom were PCC alumni. The stadium was completed in 1999, after a renovation to move the stadium from a North-West position to an East-West direction. The stadium's surface is SprinTurf, while the track has been converted to an all-weather surface. In addition to the school students, the stadium is used by local students from Marshall Fundamental Secondary School, Pasadena High School, and Blair International Baccalaureate School for some high school home football games due to lack of resources on the respective campus fields. It has been the home of the annual two-day "Bandfest" for the Pasadena Tournament of Roses for many years.

The Pasadena City College women's badminton team won AIAW national intercollegiate championships in 1972 and 1973, topping fields that included previous champions Long Beach State and Arizona State.

Satellite campuses 
Pasadena City College has four satellite campuses, the Child Development Center, the Foothill campus, the Rosemead campus, and the Northwest campus at John Muir High School. 

The Child Development Center, located one block west of the PCC campus, is a childcare center for children of the school's students. 

The Foothill campus (formally known as the Community Education Center), located two miles east of the main campus, is an offsite facility where vocational training, some ESL courses, American Citizenship courses, and the college's high school diploma program take place. 

The Rosemead campus was established in the Fall of 2013 in efforts to provide more offerings to students throughout the district. 

The Northwest campus at John Muir High School was established in the Spring of 2016 which offers career training programs and offering high school students opportunity in applying for college courses.

Shuttles connect the main (Colorado) campus with the Foothill and Rosemead campuses (see Transportation section below).

Classes at high schools
Pasadena City College offers courses that can be taken at nearby high schools. Courses are also offered at the Armory Center for the Arts in downtown Pasadena.
 Arroyo High School in El Monte
 John Muir High School in Pasadena
 Pasadena High School
 Marshall Fundamental Secondary School in Pasadena
 Blair International Baccalaureate School in Pasadena
 South Pasadena High School
 La Cañada High School in La Cañada Flintridge
 Arcadia High School
 Temple City High School
 San Marino High School

Transportation
The campuses of Pasadena City College are directly served by several bus routes, and indirectly served by Metro L Line light rail trains at Allen station, alternatively called Allen/College station, in reference to PCC.

The Foothill campus is served by Los Angeles Metro Bus route Express , Foothill Transit route 187, and Pasadena Transit routes 31 and 60. The Rosemead campus is served by Los Angeles Metro Bus routes ,  and Express .

Pasadena City College operates two free shuttle routes for students and staff. The shuttle between the main (Colorado) campus, Allen station and the Foothill campus operates every 15 to 30 minutes on weekdays. The shuttle between the main (Colorado) campus and the Rosemead campus operates hourly on weekdays. Shuttles do not operate on weekends, holidays, or when school is not in session.

Student and faculty activism
While at John Muir, Fred Phelps was profiled in Time magazine for preaching against "sins committed on campus by students and teachers ... promiscuous petting ... evil language ... profanity ... cheating ... teachers' filthy jokes in classrooms ... [and] pandering to the lusts of the flesh". Phelps later became leader of the Westboro Baptist Church.

On March 20, 2003, on the day the United States launched Operation Iraqi Freedom, many students led by the Students for Social Justice, protested on campus against the war. Protesters went through the administration building requesting students to join their cause. Three students were arrested by campus police.

On March 7, 2007, demonstrators from Philadelphia-based Repent America demonstrated on campus, leading to tensions between demonstrators and some students. PCC students, some who were journalism students and staff members of the campus newspaper, PCC Courier, were involved in the May Day melee at MacArthur Park.

Students and faculty held a rally in support of the Jena Six on September 20, 2007. Some students were beaten and arrested at the MacArthur Park immigrant rights demonstration on May 1, 2007.

During 2012 and 2013, the school became embroiled in conflict between students and faculty and the campus administration. On August 29, 2012, the PCC Board unilaterally cancelled the subsequent six-week winter session. One student was arrested at this board meeting. Organized by a newly formed group called Coalition of Students and Faculty for Student Achievement, a rally during the first week back of the illegitimate new Spring semester kicked off a steady wave of student and faculty activism. Eventually, course sections were cut, student transfers to four-year institutions were delayed, overall full-time student enrollments were reduced, and Proposition 30 monies allotted to the school were jeopardized. According to the California Community Colleges Chancellor's Office, 2012–2013 had the lowest full-time enrollments in 17 years at 20,219; Spring 2013 had the lowest full-time enrollments in 10 years at 9838 students.  The Faculty Association filed an unfair labor practice on the District for canceling winter abruptly and won in November 2013. The district filed an appeal to the ruling, thus prolonging the orders to rescind the trimester calendar and return to the status quo while ratcheting up annual 7% compensation to affected employees.

In Spring 2013, in an unprecedented move, the Associated Students unanimously censured the administration and passed a vote of no confidence in the school's president, Mark W. Rocha, and collectively called for his immediate ouster. Separately, a vote among full-time faculty members expressed no confidence in Rocha by a margin of 92 percent to 8 percent. The Academic Faculty Senate also voted, 24–0, no confidence in the president.

The board of trustees remained firm in their support of Rocha, extending his contract another year and giving Rocha a raise. In 2014, however, the faculty maintained its disapproval of the college president's performance as revealed in the faculty-wide evaluation of the PCC President. The negative campus climate has also been a concern with the staff and faculty, which prompted a campus-wide town hall sponsored by the faculty senate. Rocha was named one of Pasadena Weeklys less-than-stellar local "turkey" leaders of 2013. After a failed attempt to find work elsewhere, Rocha announced his retirement on August 7, 2014, but later became the Chancellor of San Francisco City College, where after less than three years he was placed on leave in March 2020, according to the San Francisco Examiner.

In 2014, the Oscar-winning screenplay writer Dustin Lance Black was invited to speak at commencement, but in a controversial move he was subsequently uninvited by PCC Board of Trustees Anthony Fellow, who said, "We just don't want to give PCC a bad name." According to the Los Angeles Times, "School officials pretended that Black was never approved as commencement speaker, when in fact they approved him. They said that his brush with a sex scandal has 'no place in public discussion,' when in fact they discussed it with reporters, students and each other." The college issued an apology, and later re-extended the invitation.

Notable people 
Below is a list of Pasadena City College faculty and alumni.

Faculty 
 Edward Feser, professor of philosophy.
 Nicholas Martin, Associate Professor of the French department, is a two-time Olympic gold medalist with the 1952 and 1956 Hungarian water polo teams
 Ben Sakoguchi, artist and art educator

Alumni 
 
Michael Anthony, former bassist and a founding member of Van Halen
Stan Atkinson, television news reporter and anchor
Jennifer Batten, guitarist, known for solo work and touring with Jeff Beck and Michael Jackson
Dustin Lance Black, Oscar-award winning screenwriter, actor and LGBT activist, known for his work in the film Milk and the TV series Big Love. 
Nicholas Brendon, actor (Xander on Buffy the Vampire Slayer)
Tim Brewster, former head coach, Minnesota Golden Gophers football team
Jamal Brooks, former NFL linebacker
Don Burroughs, former NFL player
Octavia E. Butler, science fiction writer
Kim Carnes, singer, known for her 1981 hit song "Bette Davis Eyes"
Vic Carroll, former NFL player
Tommy Cole, award-winning American make-up artist, Mouseketeer, and former actor and singer
Mike Connelly, former NFL player
Dennis Cooper, poet and novelist
Michael Cooper, former Los Angeles Lakers basketball player, Coach of LA Sparks of the WNBA
John Culver, Queen of the Rose Parade
Clive Cussler, novelist
James Deen, pornographic actor
Michael Dorn, actor, best known as Worf on Star Trek (PCC connection referenced on South Park episode "Fun With Veal")
Arthur Duncan, tap dancer (attended)
Jaime Escalante, former Garfield High School (Los Angeles) teacher, work dramatized in Stand and Deliver
Darrell Evans, major league baseball player
Judi Evans, actor
Paul Fussell, literary scholar and social critic, National Book Award winner
Michelle Hamilton, Playboy playmate
Armie Hammer, actor from The Social Network
Jerome Harrison, former NFL running back
Ed Hervey, Edmonton Eskimos general manager and former CFL All-Star.
William Holden, Academy Award–winning actor
Michael Holton, former college basketball player
William Hung, American Singer, American Idol Participant
Pierre Koenig, Architect of the Case Study Home No.22 in the Hollywood Hills
Joyce Kennard, California Supreme Court
Quinton Knight, Arena Football League player
Mike Lansford, former NFL player
Jack Larson, Playwright and actor ('Jimmy Olsen' on The Adventures of Superman)
Kenny Loggins, singer and songwriter
Danella Lucioni, fashion and runway model and actress
Bob Mackie, fashion designer
Charles Manson, songwriter, philosopher, and convicted serial killer
Saladin McCullough, American football player
Elizabeth McGrath, artist
Bruce Merrifield, Nobel Prize winner in Chemistry, 1984
Anthony Miller, former NFL wide receiver
Charles Mincy, former NFL player
Carol Merrill, Let's Make a Deal model
Nate Montana, son of Joe Montana
Yura Movsisyan, Spartak Moscow player
James Mtume, Grammy-award winning songwriter, producer, singer and activist
Dennis Muren, film special effects artist
Porntip Nakhirunkanok, Miss Universe 1988 representing Thailand
Nick Nolte, Academy Award nominated actor
Kemper Nomland, architect
Jack Parsons, rocket scientist, JPL co-founder, and occultist
Fred Phelps, the pastor and leader of the Westboro Baptist Church
George Reeves, who portrayed Superman in the 1950s TV series The Adventures of Superman
William Reynolds, actor
Stan Ridgway, singer, songwriter, composer
Jackie Robinson, first African American in Major League Baseball, member of the MLB Hall of Fame
Mack Robinson, Jackie's brother, silver medalist sprinter at the 1936 Olympics as a student from PJC
David Lee Roth, vocalist of Van Halen
Betye Saar, artist
Mike Saxon, former NFL player
Herman Alfred Schmid, US Air Force Brigadier General
Rod Sherman, former NFL player
Larry Shinoda, automobile designer
Ken Shutt, American sculptor 
John Singleton, film director, well known for his film Boyz n the Hood
Sirhan Sirhan, Robert F. Kennedy's assassin
Madylin Sweeten, actress
Esther Takei Nishio, WWII internee
Jerry Tarkanian, famed former college basketball coach
Charles Tuaau, NFL nose tackle
Alex Van Halen, drummer of Van Halen
Eddie Van Halen, lead guitar of Van Halen
DeWayne Walker, college football coach
Jim Wilks, former NFL player
Kirby Wilson, NFL football coach
Verne Winchell, founder of Winchell's Donuts and former chairman of Denny's Restaurants
Matt Young, major league baseball player

Notes

References

External links
Official website

 
California Community Colleges
Educational institutions established in 1924
1924 establishments in California
Schools accredited by the Western Association of Schools and Colleges
Education in Pasadena, California
Universities and colleges in Los Angeles County, California